This is a list of members of the Swedish parliament for the term 2010–2014. The MPs were elected in the general election held on 19 September 2010 and took office on 4 October 2010. The next general election, when a new parliament will be elected, is scheduled to take place in 2014.

Composition 

Parties currently in the government are marked in bold.

List of elected MPs

Facts about the elected MPs 
 Youngest MP: William Petzäll (born 1988).
 Oldest MP: Barbro Westerholm (born 1933).
 Longest serving MP: Per Westerberg (since 1977).
 Gender balance: 192 (55%) men and 157 (45%) women.
 Number of MPs who have never served in the parliament before: 106.
 Number of MPs who served in the parliament during the previous term: 233.
 Number of MPs have who served as MPs or substitutes during any other previous terms: 10.

References

External links 
Parliament of Sweden - Members

2010-2014